Black King may refer to:
 The black king (chess)
 A black king (playing card), either the King of Spades or the King of Clubs
 Black King (comics), a number of comics characters
 Black King, a character in Syphon Filter: Dark Mirror
 Black King (Ultra monster), a kaiju from Return of Ultraman
 Lampropeltis getula, the Black King Snake
 The Black King (film), a 1932 race film starring A.B. DeComathiere
 Dub, King of Scotland, King of Alba, occasionally referred to as The Black King

See also
 Black Is King, a 2020 film and visual album by Beyoncé